The 2022 Ballon d'Or (French: Ballon d'Or) was the 66th annual ceremony of the Ballon d'Or, presented by France Football, recognising the best footballers in the world in the 2021–22 season.  For the first time in the history of the award, it was given based on the results of the season instead of the calendar year. The nominees for the ceremony were announced on 12 August 2022.

Ballon d'Or
The nominees for the award were announced on 12 August 2022. Seven-time and reigning winner Lionel Messi was not nominated for the award for the first time since 2005. For the first time since 2007, all three players who reached the podium did it for the first time.

Ballon d'Or Féminin

The nominees for the award were announced on 12 August 2022.

Kopa Trophy

The nominees for the award were announced on 12 August 2022.

Yashin Trophy

The nominees for the award were announced on 12 August 2022.

Socrates Award

Gerd Müller Trophy
The award was previously known as the Striker of the Year. It was renamed as the Gerd Müller Trophy after German striker Gerd Müller died in August 2021.

Club of the Year

References

2022
Ballon d'Or
Ballon d'Or
August 2022 events in France